Joanna Firestone (born December 8, 1986) is an American actress, comedian, and television writer. She played Sarah Conner on the television series Joe Pera Talks with You.

Biography
Joanna Firestone was born in 1986 to Jewish parents Fred and Marilyn Firestone. She has a brother, Ben Firestone, who works in commercial real estate. She grew up in Clayton, Missouri, a suburb of St. Louis. She graduated from Clayton High School and later Wesleyan University in Connecticut, with a degree in theatre.

Firestone is currently based in Brooklyn.

Career

Television work
As an actress, Firestone has appeared in the TV programs Search Party, The Jim Gaffigan Show, Broad City, The Tonight Show Starring Jimmy Fallon, CollegeHumor Originals, Boy Band, The Outs, Night Train with Wyatt Cenac, Animal Agent, High Maintenance, Jon Glaser Loves Gear, Thanksgiving, The Special Without Brett Davis, Shrill, and others.

Firestone was a consulting producer on 21 episodes of The Chris Gethard Show and performed in three episodes of the series. In 2017, Firestone performed stand-up on Comedy Central as part of Comedy Central Stand-Up Presents Jo Firestone.

In the past, Firestone was a writer for The Tonight Show Starring Jimmy Fallon and The Special Without Brett Davis. She has also performed on the Tonight Show, portraying U.S. Education Secretary Betsy DeVos, demonstrating products from the New York Toy Fair, and appearing in other sketches opposite host Jimmy Fallon.

Firestone portrayed the character Sarah Conner, a band teacher, on Joe Pera Talks with You, which aired during Adult Swim on Cartoon Network. The character's name is an homage to the Terminator movies. On the show, Firestone's character is a doomsday prepper and Joe Pera's girlfriend.

Live performance 
With Dylan Marron, Firestone wrote, performed in, and directed Ridgefield Middle School Talent Nite, which received a Capital Fringe Festival Director's Award in 2010.

Firestone has performed at the UCB Theater in Manhattan, and around New York City. About stand-up gigs in "cellar clubs," Firestone explained, "Doing comedy in New York, I’ve been conditioned to thrive in basements. I’m not ready to do a comedy show until I go down a flight of stairs."

Radio and podcasts
Firestone is the host of the program Dr. Gameshow, which originated on WFMU radio and is now a podcast on the Maximum Fun network. She and her father Fred Firestone created the game Punderdome: A Card Game for Pun Lovers (published by Random House subsidiary Clarkson Potter, 2016).

Firestone voice acts in The National Lampoon Radio Hour podcast. She serves as the producer and senior writer along with Cole Escola.

In February 2020, Firestone released the first episode of her podcast Everyday Decisions. Everyday Decisions is a comedy and personal stories podcast where Firestone interviews friends, family, and fellow comedians about the past 24 hours of their day.

In March 2020 Firestone went on comedian Mike Recine's podcast The Sitdown. In March 2021, she made a guest appearance on the YouTube channel of her childhood friend Claire Saffitz.

References

External links
 
 
 "Game-loving comic Jo Firestone plays a wild card to make Pick A Choice history"

1987 births
Living people
21st-century American comedians
American stand-up comedians
American television actresses
American television writers
American women comedians
American women television writers
Comedians from New York City
Radio personalities from New York City
21st-century American screenwriters
21st-century American actresses